The 2009 FIM Superstock 1000 Cup was the eleventh season of the FIM Superstock 1000 championship, the fifth held under this name. The FIM Superstock 1000 championship followed the same calendar as the Superbike World Championship, missing out the none European rounds of the championship. 2009 saw very little change from the previous season, with no new European circuits on the calendar.

The title was eventually won by Belgium's Xavier Siméon, who did not in the 10 races of the season finish out of the first 2 positions. Siméon took 5 wins and 5 second positions to take the championship by 57 points from Claudio Corti. Simeon's performance meant that Ducati took the manufacturers' championship by 53 points.

Race calendar and results

Championship standings

Riders' standings

Manufacturers' standings

References

External links
Official Website

Superstock 1000
FIM Superstock 1000 Cup seasons
FIM Superstock 1000 Cup